Stefan Nutz (born 15 February 1992) is an Austrian professional footballer who plays as a midfielder for Austrian Bundesliga club SV Ried.

Career
On 7 July 2019, Nutz joined SV Ried on a one-year contract with an option for one further year.

Personal
He is the brother of footballer Gerald Nutz

References

External links
 

1992 births
Living people
Austrian footballers
Association football midfielders
Austrian Football Bundesliga players
2. Liga (Austria) players
Grazer AK players
SV Grödig players
SK Rapid Wien players
SV Ried players
SC Rheindorf Altach players